Deuterated tetrahydrofuran (d8-THF) is a colourless, organic liquid at standard temperature and pressure. This heterocyclic compound has the chemical formula C4D8O, and is an isotopologue of tetrahydrofuran. Deuterated THF is used as a solvent in NMR spectroscopy, though its expense can often be prohibitive.

References 

Deuterated solvents